In mathematical analysis, the maximum (: maxima or maximums) and minimum (: minima or minimums) of a function, known generically as extremum (: extrema), are the largest and smallest value of the function, either within a given range (the local or relative extrema), or on the entire domain (the global or absolute extrema). Pierre de Fermat was one of the first mathematicians to propose a general technique, adequality, for finding the maxima and minima of functions.

As defined in set theory, the maximum and minimum of a set are the greatest and least elements in the set, respectively. Unbounded infinite sets, such as the set of real numbers, have no minimum or maximum.

Definition
Symbolically, this can be written as follows:
 is a global maximum point of function  if 
The definition of global minimum point also proceeds similarly.

If the domain X is a metric space, then f is said to have a local (or relative) maximum point at the point x∗, if there exists some ε > 0 such that  for all x in X within distance ε of x∗. Similarly, the function has a local minimum point at x∗, if f(x∗) ≤ f(x) for all x in X within distance ε of x∗. A similar definition can be used when X is a topological space, since the definition just given can be rephrased in terms of neighbourhoods. Mathematically, the given definition is written as follows:
Let  be a metric space and function . Then  is a local maximum point of function  if  such that 

The definition of local minimum point can also proceed similarly.

In both the global and local cases, the concept of a  can be defined. Note that a point is a strict global maximum point if and only if it is the unique global maximum point, and similarly for minimum points.

A continuous real-valued function with a compact domain always has a maximum point and a minimum point. An important example is a function whose domain is a closed and bounded interval of real numbers (see the graph above).

Search
Finding global maxima and minima is the goal of mathematical optimization. If a function is continuous on a closed interval, then by the extreme value theorem, global maxima and minima exist. Furthermore, a global maximum (or minimum) either must be a local maximum (or minimum) in the interior of the domain, or must lie on the boundary of the domain. So a method of finding a global maximum (or minimum) is to look at all the local maxima (or minima) in the interior, and also look at the maxima (or minima) of the points on the boundary, and take the largest (or smallest) one.

For differentiable functions, Fermat's theorem states that local extrema in the interior of a domain must occur at critical points (or points where the derivative equals zero). However, not all critical points are extrema. One can distinguish whether a critical point is a local maximum or local minimum by using the first derivative test, second derivative test, or higher-order derivative test, given sufficient differentiability.

For any function that is defined piecewise, one finds a maximum (or minimum) by finding the maximum (or minimum) of each piece separately, and then seeing which one is largest (or smallest).

Examples

Setting this equal to 

reveals that  is our only critical point.
Since width is positive, then , and since  that implies that 

Therefore, the greatest area attainable with a rectangle of  feet of fencing is

Functions of more than one variable

For functions of more than one variable, similar conditions apply. For example, in the (enlargeable) figure on the right, the necessary conditions for a local maximum are similar to those of a function with only one variable. The first partial derivatives as to z (the variable to be maximized) are zero at the maximum (the glowing dot on top in the figure).  The second partial derivatives are negative. These are only necessary, not sufficient, conditions for a local maximum, because of the possibility of a saddle point. For use of these conditions to solve for a maximum, the function z must also be differentiable throughout. The second partial derivative test can help classify the point as a relative maximum or relative minimum.
In contrast, there are substantial differences between functions of one variable and functions of more than one variable in the identification of global extrema. For example, if a bounded differentiable function f defined on a closed interval in the real line has a single critical point, which is a local minimum, then it is also a global minimum (use the intermediate value theorem and Rolle's theorem to prove this by contradiction). In two and more dimensions, this argument fails. This is illustrated by the function

whose only critical point is at (0,0), which is a local minimum with f(0,0) = 0. However, it cannot be a global one, because f(2,3) = −5.

Maxima or minima of a functional
If the domain of a function for which an extremum is to be found consists itself of functions (i.e. if an extremum is to be found of a functional), then the extremum is found using the calculus of variations.

In relation to sets
Maxima and minima can also be defined for sets. Furthermore, if S is a subset of an ordered set T and m is the greatest element of S with (respect to order induced by T), then m is a least upper bound of S in T. Similar results hold for least element, minimal element and greatest lower bound. The maximum and minimum function for sets are used in databases, and can be computed rapidly, since the maximum (or minimum) of a set can be computed from the maxima of a partition; formally, they are self-decomposable aggregation functions.

In the case of a general partial order, the least element (i.e., one that is smaller than all others) should not be confused with a minimal element (nothing is smaller). Likewise, a greatest element of a partially ordered set (poset) is an upper bound of the set which is contained within the set, whereas a maximal element m of a poset A is an element of A such that if m ≤ b (for any b in A), then m = b. Any least element or greatest element of a poset is unique, but a poset can have several minimal or maximal elements.  If a poset has more than one maximal element, then these elements will not be mutually comparable.

In a totally ordered set, or chain, all elements are mutually comparable, so such a set can have at most one minimal element and at most one maximal element.  Then, due to mutual comparability, the minimal element will also be the least element, and the maximal element will also be the greatest element. Thus in a totally ordered set, we can simply use the terms minimum and maximum. 

If a chain is finite, then it will always have a maximum and a minimum.  If a chain is infinite, then it need not have a maximum or a minimum.  For example, the set of natural numbers has no maximum, though it has a minimum. If an infinite chain S is bounded, then the closure Cl(S) of the set occasionally has a minimum and a maximum, in which case they are called the greatest lower bound and the least upper bound of the set S, respectively.

See also
Arg max
Derivative test
Infimum and supremum
Limit superior and limit inferior
Maximum-minimums identity
Mechanical equilibrium
Mex (mathematics)
Sample maximum and minimum
Saddle point

References

External links

Thomas Simpson's work on Maxima and Minima at Convergence
Application of Maxima and Minima with sub pages of solved problems

Calculus
Mathematical analysis
Mathematical optimization
Superlatives